Mrs. Bridge is the debut novel by American author Evan S. Connell, published in 1959. In 117 brief episodes, it tells the story of an upper middle-class, bourgeois family in Kansas City in the period between the First and Second World War, mostly from the perspective of the mother, the Mrs. Bridge of the title. Mrs. Bridge and her family are forced to deal with the changing habits and morality of the America of that time, especially in the areas of civil rights and gender equality. The book was followed in 1969 by Mr. Bridge. The two books were adapted for the screen and the resulting film was released as Mr. and Mrs. Bridge (1990).

Synopsis
Evan Connell has said the character of India Bridge is based on his mother. His mother was an eccentric woman named Ruth who,  however, preferred to be called "Elton". He said his mother was dying of cancer at the time the book was published in 1959, and she never read the book. Connell, like the family in the story, grew up in Kansas City.

The eponymous character, India Bridge, is a wife and mother of three in a well-to-do middle-class family in Kansas City. Her husband, Walter, is a lawyer who spends most of his time at the office. Mrs. Bridge's life revolves around her children and much of it plays out in the home and in and around the country club, in a social environment whose primary values are "unity, sameness, consensus, centeredness". Her fears and anxieties are revealed through her actions rather than spelled out; one moment of "inarticulate rage," as one reviewer called it, occurs when her son uses one of the guest towels: "'These towels are for guests,' said Mrs. Bridge, and felt herself unaccountably on the verge of tears". She is particularly though vaguely disturbed by "her son's penchant for coming into the house through the 'servants' entrance' rather than through the front door", since it forces her into thinking about class. Though the 117 vignettes are chronologically organized, from the 1920s to the early 1940s, there is not much in the way of plot, consistent with Mrs. Bridge's life in which nothing dramatic seems to happen, and her first name, "India", is indicative of the elusiveness of life and excitement: "It seemed to her that her parents must have been thinking of someone else when they named her".

As the novel progresses it becomes clear that the elusiveness of the excitement that could be associated with her first name is symptomatic, and Mrs. Bridge goes from one almost-realization to the next. Her almost-realization of class difference occurs when she is struck, in a bookshop, by a book called Theory of the Leisure Class (a social critique of conspicuous consumption), a book she skims through and is disquieted by. One of her friends, Gracie, asks her if she also feels sometimes as if she is "all hollowed out in the back", a question Mrs. Bridge remembers only when she hears that her friend has killed herself.

Mr. Bridge, though longer since (according to one critic) his life is more complicated, deals with the same "key moments". Gerald Shapiro referred to this as the "double exposure" of the two novels--"a curious double exposure, like a photograph taken once in shadow, once in light."

Reception and legacy
The novel has been somewhat neglected, overshadowed perhaps by the simultaneously appearing debuts of Philip Roth, John Updike, and Richard Yates. By 1962, when critic Michael Robbins proclaimed that Mrs. Bridge answered the question asked by writer and social critic, "what kind of people we are producing, what kinds of lives we are leading", the novel was already out of print: readers of College Composition and Communication were urged to write the publishers in hopes of getting the book reprinted. In 1982, when both Bridge books were republished, Brooks Landon, in The Iowa Review, commented that "Connell seems to have become one of those writers we know to respect but may not have read". Writers and critics, however few, continue to praise its sensitivity and importance; Tom Cox, in The Guardian, writes that it is "one of the sharper novels about mid-20th-century domestic life".

Critic Mark Oppenheimer, writing in The Believer, called Mrs. Bridge one of Connell's "three classics of Wasp repression" (the other two being the novels Mr. Bridge and The Connoisseur). American novelist James Patterson, who said Mrs. Bridge was the one novel that probably influenced him the most (Joshua Ferris is another admirer), said it and Mr. Bridge "capture the sadness, and boredom, of the unexamined life" and praises the compassion and precision of Connell's writing. British critic Matthew Dennison (who praised the "studiedly simple, undecorated prose, with few rhetorical flourishes") compared the main character to Jan Struther's Mrs. Miniver; both inhabit "an interwar world shaped by a promise of certainties — domestic, social, cultural and sexual — which are never wholly realised and remain frustratingly elusive".

Publication history
Mrs. Bridge began as a short story, "The Beau Monde of Mrs. Bridge", published in the Fall 1955 issues of The Paris Review. Both Mrs. Bridge and Mr. Bridge were republished in the United States in 2005 by Shoemaker & Hoard, Washington, D.C. The fiftieth anniversary of the novel (in 2009) was celebrated with a special edition of the novel, with photographs by Laurie Simmons and an introduction by Mark Oppenheimer.

References
Citations from the novel are from Mrs. Bridge (2005), Shoemaker & Hoard, Washington D.C, .

1959 American novels
Viking Press books
Novels set in Missouri
Culture of Kansas City, Missouri
American novels adapted into films
1959 debut novels